Sell Me The Answer is a game show that aired on Sky 1 from 9 November 2009 to 29 January 2010 and is hosted by Gethin Jones.

Format
The game is played by one person at a time.  The player approaches from the front of the set to stand at a podium, opposite Gethin Jones.  After a brief introduction, the player is given a £50 start and introduced to their first of ten questions, each of which increases in value.  The player must answer all ten questions correctly in order to win this money – an incorrect answer at any stage means the player leaving the game with nothing.

To assist the player, the studio also houses 60 "traders" in a position normally reserved for an audience.  On any one question, one of these traders can offer their knowledge at a prearranged price.  If the player feels the need to ask for help, they must shout "Sell Me the Answer!" to the traders.  At this point, the traders must try to attract the player's attention.  The player then chooses two traders from the crowd.  These two traders each have ten seconds to convince the player that they know the answer, before the player selects one of them.  This trader then approaches the podium.  A 30-second haggle now ensues in which the player and trader must decide on a price for the trader's information.  If a deal is made, this amount is deducted from the player's pot and is given to the trader (whether they actually know the answer or not) and the players exchange information.  If no deal is made, the trader leaves empty-handed and the player must answer on their own.  Each trader may only be used once in the game, and the player may only use one trader per question.

Once the player has settled on an answer, they must "lock-down" on that answer using an oversized plunger on the podium.  Jones then tells the player if they are right or wrong.

Once a player answers all 10 questions correctly, they face another choice:  They may take all the money acquired so far (the sum of all question values, including the £50 start, minus the cost of all trades) or can choose to gamble everything on the Jackpot question.  On this question, no help may be sought from the traders, so the player must answer on their own.  A correct answer rewards the player with £25,000.  An incorrect answer sees the player leaving with nothing.

Possible Strategies:

By the Player:
The Player’s strategy would be to seek the help of the Sellers for all the questions whether he knows it or not. This would keep the audience guessing whether the Player actually knows the answer or not. The Player would maintain confidence and pretend that he knows the answer.

This would make the seller start the bid with reasonable amount. To the bid amount, the player may try to play on the skills/psyche of the Seller by even keep on reducing the earlier offer to show that the Player really knows the answer to compel the seller to agree to the Player’s offer.

Counter Strategy by the Seller:
The Seller (who may or may not know the answer) would pretend that he knows the answer and is trustworthy. He would also try to guess whether the Player actually knows the answer or is bluffing. If the Seller feels that the Player knows the answer, the Seller may have no option but to agree to the Player’s offer. But, if the Seller feels that the Player is bluffing, he would keep on increasing his bid. If the final amount agreed by the Player is not satisfactory to the Seller, he may give a misleading answer to the Player (remember the Seller would anyway get the agreed amount whether the answer is right or wrong). The Player then would have to decide whether to go with the sellers answer or not. If the Player goes with the Seller’s misleading answer, the seller would have successfully sought revenge on the player for offering a very small amount.

In the current version the Seller will only win money if he provides the correct answer.

Possible win Scenarios:

Both Player and Seller Knows the correct answer
Player knows the answer but the Seller is bluffing.
Player does not know the answer but the Seller knows (in this case extracting the correct answer from Seller may depend on Player’s skill & Final Offer).

Prize structure
The prizes from each question is as follows:

If all questions are correctly answered without the use of any traders, the player can accumulate £10,000 before deciding on whether or not to play the Jackpot round.  If traders are used to the maximum extent, a player will still acquire £2000 at this point.

The Jackpot round, if the player chooses to play it, is always worth £25,000 and negates any money won to that point.

External links

Sky UK original programming
2000s British game shows
2010s British game shows
2009 British television series debuts
2010 British television series endings
English-language television shows